Lectionary 35, designated by siglum ℓ 35 (in the Gregory-Aland numbering), is a Greek manuscript of the New Testament, on parchment leaves. Palaeographically it has been assigned to the 11th-century.

Description 

The codex contains lessons from the Gospels of John, Matthew, Luke lectionary (Evangelistarium), with lacunae. It is written in Greek uncial letters, on 151 parchment leaves, one column per page, in 11 lines per page.
It contains only the lessons for holidays

History 

It was examined by Bianchini and Birch. C. R. Gregory saw it in 1886.

The manuscript is not cited in the critical editions of the Greek New Testament (UBS3).

Currently the codex is located in the Vatican Library (Vat. Gr. 351) in Rome.

See also 

 List of New Testament lectionaries
 Biblical manuscript
 Textual criticism

Notes and references

Bibliography 

 G. Bianchini, Evangeliarium quadruplex latinae versionis antiquae seu veteris italicae (Rome, 1749), 1. Part, 2. vol., p. 504. 

Greek New Testament lectionaries
11th-century biblical manuscripts
Manuscripts of the Vatican Library